Sir Derrick Wellesley Gunston, 1st Baronet MC, (26 February 1891 – 13 July 1985) was a Unionist politician in the United Kingdom.

Gunston served with the Irish Guards in World War I and was awarded the Military Cross in 1918.

He was elected at the 1924 general election as Member of Parliament (MP) for the Thornbury constituency, in Gloucestershire, and held the seat until his defeat at the 1945 general election by the Labour Party candidate, Joseph Alpass.

In February 1938, he was made a baronet, of Wickwar in the County of Gloucester.

In 1943, he was on a British Parliamentary Commission to investigate the future of Newfoundland and Labrador; the other members were Charles Ammon (Chairman) and A. P. Herbert.

References

External links 
 

1891 births
1985 deaths
Baronets in the Baronetage of the United Kingdom
Conservative Party (UK) MPs for English constituencies
UK MPs 1924–1929
UK MPs 1929–1931
UK MPs 1931–1935
UK MPs 1935–1945
People from Wickwar
Recipients of the Military Cross